Almāle is a village in Alsunga Parish, Kuldīga Municipality in the Courland region of Latvia.

References

Kuldīga Municipality
Towns and villages in Latvia
Aizpute County
Courland